Andy O'Brien (born 1988) is an Irish hurler who plays as a full-forward for the Wicklow senior team.

Honours

Wicklow
National Hurling League Division 2B (1): 2014
National Hurling League Division 3A (1): 2011
National Hurling League Division 3B (1): 2010
Christy Ring Cup Runners-up (2): 2011, 2012

Individual

Christy Ring Cup Champion 15 Awards (2): 2010, 2011

References

1988 births
Living people
St Patrick's (Wicklow) hurlers
Wicklow inter-county hurlers